Alan Dana Taylor (born October 27, 1947) is an American mathematician who, with Steven Brams, solved the problem of envy-free cake-cutting for an arbitrary number of people with the Brams–Taylor procedure.

Taylor received his Ph.D. in 1975 from Dartmouth College.

He was the Marie Louise Bailey professor of mathematics at Union College, in Schenectady, New York.

He retired from the college in 2022.

Selected publications
 Alan D. Taylor (1995) Mathematics and Politics: Strategy, Voting, Power, and Proof Springer-Verlag.  and 0-387-94500-8; with Allison Pacelli: 
 Steven J. Brams and Alan D. Taylor (1995). An Envy-Free Cake Division Protocol American Mathematical Monthly, 102, pp. 9–18. (JSTOR)
 Steven J. Brams and Alan D. Taylor (1996). Fair Division - From cake-cutting to dispute resolution Cambridge University Press.  and

Notes

External links
Alan Taylor - Union College

Living people
20th-century American mathematicians
21st-century American mathematicians
Game theorists
Dartmouth College alumni
Union College (New York)
American political scientists
Fair division researchers
1947 births